Agustín "Pijini" Bejerano (May 16, 1909 - November 6, 1972) was a Cuban baseball left fielder and manager in the Negro leagues and Mexican League. He played with the Lincoln Giants and Cuban Stars (East) from 1928 to 1929, before spending time with several Mexican League clubs from 1937 to 1955. He also served as a manager for multiple teams from 1949 to 1964. 
He was named to the Mexican Professional Baseball Hall of Fame in 1973.

References

External links
 and Seamheads

1909 births
1972 deaths
Cuban Stars (East) players
Lincoln Giants players
Rojos del Águila de Veracruz players
Azules de Veracruz players
Tecolotes de Nuevo Laredo players
Industriales de Monterrey players
Algodoneros de Unión Laguna players
Saraperos de Saltillo players
Baseball outfielders
Mexican Baseball Hall of Fame inductees
Cuban expatriate baseball players in Mexico
Cuban expatriate baseball players in the United States
People from Manzanillo, Cuba